The Time Traveler's Almanac (British title: The Time Traveller's Almanac) is a 2013 anthology edited by Ann and Jeff VanderMeer. It contains stories that focus on time travel. It was released in November 2013 in the UK and on March 18, 2014, in the US.

Background

Regarding the motivation behind Time Traveler's Almanac, Ann VanderMeer said that there were two main reasons. First was that Ann and Jeff needed "a break from the seriousness of The Weird." Secondly, they felt they could offer something different from existing time travel anthologies.

Contents

Sixty-five short stories and five essays are featured in The Time Traveler's Almanac.

Fiction
Stories are listed in alphabetical order by author.

"Young Zaphod Plays It Safe" by Douglas Adams
"Terminós" by Dean Francis Alfar
"What If—" by Isaac Asimov
"Noble Mold" by Kage Baker
"A Night on the Barbary Coast" by Kage Baker
"Life Trap" by Barrington J. Bayley
"This Tragic Glass" by Elizabeth Bear
"Enoch Soames: A Memory of the Eighteen-Nineties" by Max Beerbohm
"The Most Important Thing in the World" by Steve Bein
"In The Tube" by E. F. Benson 
"The Mask of the Rex" by Richard Bowes
"A Sound of Thunder" by Ray Bradbury
"Bad Timing" by Molly Brown
"The Gulf of the Years" by Georges-Olivier Châteaureynaud
"The Threads of Time" by C. J. Cherryh
"Thirty Seconds From Now" by John Chu
"Palindromic" by Peter Crowther
"Domine" by Rjurik Davidson
"The Lost Continent" by Greg Egan
"The Gernsback Continuum" by William Gibson
"3 RMS, Good View" by Karen Haber
"Message in a Bottle" by Nalo Hopkinson
"The Great Clock" by Langdon Jones
"Hwang's Billion Brilliant Daughters" by Alice Sola Kim
"On the Watchtower at Plataea" by Garry Kilworth
"Time Gypsies" by Ellen Klages
"Vintage Season" by Henry Kuttner & C. L. Moore
"At Dorado" by Geoffrey A. Landis
"Ripples in the Dirac Sea" by Geoffrey Landis
"The Final Days" by David Langford
"Fish Night" by Joe Lansdale
"As Time Goes By" by Tanith Lee
"Another Story" by Ursula K. Le Guin
"Loob" by Bob Leman
"Alexia and Graham Bell" by Rosaleen Love
"Traveller's Rest" by David I. Masson
"Death Ship" by Richard Matheson
"Under Siege" by George R. R. Martin
"The Clock That Went Backwards" by Edward Page Mitchell
"Pale Roses" by Michael Moorcock
"The House that Made the Sixteen Loops of Time" by Tamsyn Muir
"Is There Anybody There?" by Kim Newman
"Come-From-Aways" by Tony Pi
"The Time Telephone" by Adam Roberts
"Red Letter Day" by Kristine Kathryn Rusch
"The Waitabits" by Eric Frank Russell
"If Ever I Should Leave You" by Pamela Sargent
"How the Future Got Better" by Eric Schaller
"Needle in a Timestack" by Robert Silverberg
"Delhi" by Vandana Singh
"Himself in Anachron" by Cordwainer Smith
"The Weed of Time" by Norman Spinrad
"Palimpsest" by Charlie Stross
"Yesterday Was Monday" by Theodore Sturgeon
"Triceratops Summer" by Michael Swanwick
"The Mouse Ran Down" by Adrian Tchaikovsky
"Augusta Prima" by Karin Tidbeck
"Twenty-One and Counting Up" by Harry Turtledove
"Forty, Counting Down" by Harry Turtledove
"Where or When" by Steven Utley
"Swing Time" by Carrie Vaughn
excerpt from The Time Machine by H. G. Wells
"Fire Watch" by Connie Willis
"Against the Lafayette Escadrille" by Gene Wolfe
"The Lost Pilgrim" by Gene Wolfe

Non-fiction
"Introduction" by Rian Johnson
"Music for Time Travelers" by Jason Heller
"Time Travel in Theory and Practice" by Stan Love
"Trousseau: Fashion for Time Travelers" by Genevieve Valentine
"Top Ten Tips for Time Travelers" by Charles Yu

References

External links
 AVClub posting of the Preface to The Time Traveler's Almanac

2013 anthologies
Science fiction anthologies
Short fiction about time travel
Tor Books books